Navalrai Clock Tower, Hyderabad, also known as Ghanta Ghar, Hyderabad, and Market Clock Tower, Hyderabad, is a clock tower located in Hyderabad, Sindh.

History

Navalrai Clock Tower was built in 1914 with fish and meat market at Hirabad. It was named after Naval Rai, a duty collector in the region. The tower was constructed by the Hyderabad Municipal Corporation when Sir Rao Bahadur Dewan Chand Dayaram was president and was designed by P.C Thadani. The stones used during the construction were imported from Delhi.

In the 1990s, the tower and its halls were renovated.

References

1914 establishments in British India
Tourist attractions in Hyderabad, Sindh
Clock towers in Pakistan